El Mahalla El Kubra – commonly shortened to  – is the largest city of the Gharbia Governorate and in the Nile Delta, with a population of 535,278 as of 2012. It is a large industrial and agricultural city in Egypt, located in the middle of the Nile Delta on the western bank of the Damietta Branch tributary. The city is known for its textile industry, and hosts the Misr Spinning and Weaving Company which employs around 27,000 people.

Etymology
El Mahalla El Kubra consists of two words: El Mahalla in Arabic means "district" or "encampment", El Kubra means "great". Hence the title collectively means "The Great Encampment". It's a rough translation of a Coptic Egyptian name ϯϣⲁⲓⲣⲓ "cohabitation" or "residence", but the second part of it – "El Kubra" may come from the Hellenistic name of the same settlement – "Theodosiou Nixis" (where ⲛⲓⲝⲓⲥ is most likely a Greek transcription of Coptic ⲛⲓϣϯ – "great").

History

Roman Egypt
El Mahalla El Kubra was known as "Theodosiou" or "Theodosiou Nixis" (where ⲛⲓⲝⲓⲥ is most likely a Greek transcription of Coptic ⲛⲓϣϯ – "great") (which might refer to Hibiscus cannabinus) in Ptolematic and Roman Egypt, meanwhile it was known as "ϯϣⲁⲓⲣⲓ" in Coptic records.

Mamluk Egypt & Egypt Eyalet
El Mahalla El Kubra was designated as the capital of Gharbia Governorate in 1320 by Ibn Qalawun, before it was relocated to Tanta in 1836.

2006–11 protests
Over 15,000 protesters clashed with police in El Mahalla in 2006, following the publication of a cartoon mocking Islam in Denmark.

Later in 2006 textile workers struck to protest market reforms, demanding better living conditions.

Beginning in April 2008 the city held mass demonstrations protesting the election results of President Hosni Mubarak, claiming election fraud and demanding better wages. Security forces were ordered to crack down on the dissidents, and in May they killed two or three in the city and injured dozens. Images of protesters in Mahalla overturning billboards of Mubarak were viewed by some Egyptians as a turning point in Egyptian politics, according to The Washington Post. The Observer has written that protests in El Mahalla from 2006 to 2011 spearheaded larger political changes throughout Egypt. A Facebook group established by 28-year-old engineer Ahmad Maher to support striking textile workers in El Mahalla gained 70,000 followers and helped organize support for the strikers nationally.

In 2011, protests in Mahalla contributed to the collapse of the Mubarak dictatorship.

2012 protests and declaration of autonomy
On 15 July 2012, 25,000 workers from El Mahalla El Kubra's Misr Spinning and Weaving Company went on strike, demanding increased profit sharing, better retirement benefits and a replacement of the management. The Misr workers were joined by workers from seven other textile factories in the region, and strikes also broke out among doctors and health workers, university workers, and ceramics workers in other parts of Egypt.

Clashes between protesters supporting or opposing the Muslim Brotherhood on November 28 left over 100 people injured. On December 7, the city declared itself autonomous from Egypt, as workers and students, declaring themselves independent from the "Muslim Brotherhood State", cut rail lines and blocked entrances to the city. Protesters stormed the city council and announced their intentions to replace it with a revolutionary council.

Geography

Climate

The Köppen–Geiger climate classification system classifies its climate as hot desert (BWh).

Buildings and structures
El Mahalla El Kubra contains Misr Spinning and Weaving Company, the largest cotton manufacturing company in Egypt, and the clock of Big Ben is made by this company.

Economy
El Mahalla El Kubra is home to the largest public sector Egyptian textile company, the Misr Spinning and Weaving Company, employing over 27,000 workers.

Sport
The city has two football teams: Ghazl Al-Mehalla and Baladeyet Al-Mahalla.

Notable people
 Ahmed Elmohamady, Egyptian Footballer and Current Captain
 Mahmoud Mokhtar, a legendary Egyptian sculptor
 Cyril of Alexandria, Patriarch of Alexandria from 412 to 444
 Salah Zulfikar, legendary actor
 Shawky Gharieb, former footballer and coach
 Mohamed Elneny, footballer
 Reham Abdel Ghafour, actress

See also
 List of cities and towns in Egypt
 April 6 Youth Movement

References

External links

Populated places in Gharbia Governorate